Angus Turner Jones (born October 8, 1993) is an American former actor. He is best known for playing Jake Harper in the CBS sitcom Two and a Half Men, for which he won two Young Artist Awards and a TV Land Award during his 10-year tenure as one of the show's main characters.

Early life and acting career
Jones was born in Austin, Texas, the older of two sons.

Jones's first film role was as a five-year-old in the 1999 film Simpatico. From 2001 to 2003, he had supporting roles in films including See Spot Run, The Rookie, Bringing Down the House, George of the Jungle 2, and The Christmas Blessing.

Two and a Half Men
In 2003, Jones was cast in the sitcom Two and a Half Men as Jake Harper, the "half man" of the title, a 10-year-old living with his divorced father (played by Jon Cryer) and hedonistic uncle (played by Charlie Sheen). The show was the most popular sitcom in the United States for most of its run, with an average audience of around 15 million people.

In 2010, Jones became the highest-paid child star in television at the age of 17 when his new contract with Two and a Half Men guaranteed him US$7.8 million over the next two seasons, amounting to US$300,000 for each of the 26 episodes.

During the show's ninth season, which ran from 2011 to 2012, Jones' character Jake was given more adult storylines: he was portrayed as a heavy marijuana user, as well as being sexually active both with girls his own age and older women. The final episode of season 9 shows Jake graduating from high school and joining the army. At the annual PaleyFest held in Los Angeles, California in March 2012, Jones, who turned 18 during the ninth season, said that he was uncomfortable with the new storylines, saying that it was "very awkward" to do the "adult thing" while not an adult.

In October 2012, Jones described his path to a newfound religious faith in detail during an interview with a Seventh-day Adventist–sponsored Voice of Prophecy radio program.

In November 2012, Jones said that he had been baptized and no longer wanted to appear on Two and a Half Men, calling the show "filth" and saying it conflicted with his religious views. He also encouraged people to stop watching the show. His views gained the attention of the media after Jones appeared in a video posted on the YouTube channel of ForeRunner Chronicles, an independent ministry run by Christopher Hudson. Jones issued a statement the next day clarifying his position.

Soon afterward, the Seventh-day Adventist Church in North America released a statement indicating that the Forerunner Chronicles is not associated with the Adventist Church and that Hudson is not an ordained Seventh-day Adventist pastor.

Producers for the show said he was not expected back on the set until 2013, as his character does not appear in the last few episodes of season 10. CBS announced in April 2013 that he would be downgraded to recurring status for season 11, but ultimately he did not appear at all during Season 11. He was replaced on the show by Amber Tamblyn. On March 18, 2014, Angus T. Jones officially announced his departure from the show, stating he had been "a paid hypocrite". However, he returned in a cameo for the series finale in Season 12, "Of Course He's Dead", which aired on February 19, 2015.

Business career

In 2016, Jones joined the management team of Tonite, a multimedia and event production company started by Justin Combs and Kene Orjioke.

Personal life
Jones attended University of Colorado Boulder after departing Two and a Half Men. 

As of 2016, Jones is no longer a member of faith-based “business-model” organizations, and has expressed an interest in returning to acting.

Charity work
On June 7, 2008, Jones lent his support to the First Star Organization to help abused and neglected children.

In August 2008, Jones joined other celebrities at the annual "Rock 'N Roll Fantasy Camp".

On October 4, 2008, Jones attended the Variety's Power of Youth benefit for St. Jude Children's Research Hospital in Memphis, Tennessee.

In October 2009, Two and a Half Men co-star Jon Cryer presented Jones with the award for the Rising Star of 2009 at the Big Brothers Big Sisters Rising Star Gala.

Jones has supported the anti-bullying alliance Be A Star co-founded by The Creative Coalition and WWE.

Filmography

Films

Television

Awards

References

External links

1993 births
20th-century American male actors
21st-century American male actors
American male child actors
American male film actors
American male television actors
Former Seventh-day Adventists
Converts to Adventism
Living people
Male actors from Austin, Texas
Male actors from Texas
University of Colorado Boulder alumni